Monin may refer to:

 Monin (company), a French company, producing liqueurs and syrups
 Mønin, a mountain of Buskerud, Norway

People with the surname
 Andrei Monin (1921–2007), Russian physicist, mathematician and oceanographer
 Clarence V. Monin (1941), Trade unionist from Kentucky
 Georges Monin (1893–1944), French entrepreneur, founder of Monin company
 Gilles du Monin (1565–1624), Belgian historian and liturgical author
 Jean-Michel Monin (born 1967), French cyclist
 Samuel Monin (1979), Senegalese retired footballer
Surnames from given names